Chernobyl is a 2019 historical drama television miniseries that revolves around the Chernobyl disaster of 1986 and the cleanup efforts that followed. The series was created and written by Craig Mazin and directed by Johan Renck. It features an ensemble cast led by Jared Harris, Stellan Skarsgård, Emily Watson and Paul Ritter. The series was produced by HBO in the United States and Sky UK in the United Kingdom.

The five-part series premiered simultaneously in the United States on May 6, 2019, and in the United Kingdom on May 7. It was acclaimed by critics, who lauded the performances, cinematography, historical accuracies, atmosphere, direction, screenplay, musical score and tone. At the 71st Primetime Emmy Awards, it received nineteen nominations and won for Outstanding Limited Series, Outstanding Directing, and Outstanding Writing, while Harris, Skarsgård, and Watson received acting nominations. At the 77th Golden Globe Awards, the series won for Best Miniseries or Television Film and Skarsgård won for Best Supporting Actor in a Series, Miniseries or Television Film.

While the series was exhaustively researched, some liberties were taken for dramatic purposes. The release of each episode was accompanied by a podcast in which Mazin and NPR host Peter Sagal discuss these changes and the reasoning behind them. While critics, experts and witnesses have noted historical and factual discrepancies in the miniseries, the creators' attention to detail has been widely praised.

Premise
Chernobyl dramatizes the story of the April 1986 nuclear plant disaster which occurred in the Ukrainian Soviet Socialist Republic, Soviet Union, telling the stories of the people who were involved in the disaster and those who responded to it. The series depicts some of the lesser-known stories of the disaster, including the efforts of the firefighters who were the first responders on the scene, volunteers, and teams of miners who dug a critical tunnel under Reactor 4.

The miniseries is based in large part on the recollections of Pripyat locals, as told by Belarusian Nobel laureate Svetlana Alexievich in her book Voices from Chernobyl.

Cast

Main
 Jared Harris as Valery Legasov, the deputy director of the Kurchatov Institute brought in to aid cleanup efforts.
 Stellan Skarsgård as Boris Shcherbina, a Council of Ministers' deputy chairman.
 Emily Watson as Ulana Khomyuk, a nuclear physicist from Minsk. Khomyuk is a fictional composite character based on the many scientists who investigated the accident.
 Paul Ritter as Anatoly Dyatlov, the deputy chief engineer at the Chernobyl Nuclear Power Plant.
 Jessie Buckley as Lyudmilla Ignatenko, the wife of Vasily Ignatenko.
 Adam Nagaitis as Vasily Ignatenko, a Pripyat firefighter and first responder to the Chernobyl fire.
 Con O'Neill as Viktor Bryukhanov, the manager of Chernobyl.
 Adrian Rawlins as Nikolai Fomin, the chief engineer at Chernobyl.
 Sam Troughton as Aleksandr Akimov, the night shift supervisor at Chernobyl.
 Robert Emms as Leonid Toptunov, the senior engineer at Chernobyl.
 David Dencik as Mikhail Gorbachev, the General Secretary of the Communist Party of the Soviet Union.
 Mark Lewis Jones as Vladimir Pikalov, the commander of the Soviet chemical forces.
 Alan Williams as Charkov, the KGB's first deputy chairman.
 Alex Ferns as Andrei Glukhov, the mining crew chief.
 Ralph Ineson as Nikolai Tarakanov, the chief supervisor of the cleanup operation.
 Barry Keoghan as Pavel Gremov, a civilian liquidator draftee.
 Fares Fares as Bacho, a Georgian soldier and Soviet–Afghan War veteran who trains Pavel.
 Michael McElhatton as Andrei Stepashin, the prosecutor for the trial of Dyatlov, Bryukhanov, and Fomin.

Recurring
 Adam Lundgren as Vyacheslav Brazhnik, the senior turbine operator at Chernobyl.
 Karl Davies as Viktor Proskuryakov, a senior reactor control engineer trainee at Chernobyl.
 Donald Sumpter as Zharkov, a Pripyat executive committee member.
 Billy Postlethwaite as Boris Stolyarchuk, the senior unit #4 control engineer at Chernobyl.
 Joshua Leese as Igor Kirschenbaum, a senior turbine control engineer at Chernobyl.
 Nadia Clifford as Svetlana Zinchenko, a doctor treating Vasily Ignatenko and others with radiation sickness.
 Jamie Sives as Anatoly Sitnikov, the deputy chief operational engineer at Chernobyl sent to inspect the exploded core.
 Douggie McMeekin as Aleksandr Yuvchenko, a senior engineer-mechanic on duty the night of the explosion.
 Michael Socha as Mikhail, a resident of Pripyat and father of a young baby who are both present on the bridge watching the fire.

Guest
 Natasha Radski as Russian news reader.
 Jay Simpson as Valeriy Perevozchenko, the foreman in the reactor section.
 Michael Colgan as Mikhail Shchadov, Soviet Minister of Coal Industry.
 James Cosmo as a miner.
 Peter Guinness as Major Burov.
 Hilton McRae as Milan Kadnikov, the judge presiding over the trial of Dyatlov, Bryukhanov, and Fomin.
 Kieran O'Brien as Valery Khodemchuk, the night shift main circulating pump operator at Chernobyl.
 Alexej Manvelov as Garo, an Armenian soldier who accompanies Bacho and Pavel.
 Josef Altin as Soldier

Episodes

Production

Development and writing
Writer Craig Mazin began researching for the project in 2014, by reading books and government reports from inside and outside the Soviet Union. Mazin also interviewed nuclear scientists to learn how a reactor works, and former Soviet citizens to gain a better idea of the culture in 1986. Mazin also read several first-person accounts in order to bring additional authenticity to the story. He explained, "When you're reading the personal stories of people who were there—people who lived near the plant, people who worked at the plant, people who were sent to Chernobyl as part of the effort to clean it up—in those individual accounts, that's really where the story came alive".

Mazin's interest in creating the series originated when he decided to write something that addressed "how we're struggling with the global war on the truth right now". Another inspiration is that he knew Chernobyl exploded, but he did not know why. He explained, "I didn't know why, and I thought there was this inexplicable gap in my knowledge ... So, I began reading about it, just out of this very dry, intellectual curiosity, and what I discovered was that, while the story of the explosion is fascinating, and we make it really clear exactly why and how it happened, what really grabbed me and held me were the incredible stories of the human beings who lived through it, and who suffered and sacrificed to save the people that they loved, to save their countrymen and to save a continent, and continued to do so, against odds that were startling and kept getting worse. I was so moved by it. It was like I had discovered a war that people just hadn't really depicted, and I became obsessed". Mazin said that "The lesson of Chernobyl isn't that modern nuclear power is dangerous. The lesson is that lying, arrogance, and suppression of criticism are dangerous".

In preparation for the miniseries, Mazin visited the Chernobyl Exclusion Zone. Mazin made the decision in the early stages not to use Russian or Ukrainian accents, and instead, have the actors use their natural accents. Mazin explained, "We had an initial thought that we didn't want to do the 'Boris and Natasha' clichéd accent because the Russian accent can turn comic very easily. At first, we thought that maybe we would have people do these sort of vaguely Eastern European accents—not really strong but noticeable. What we found very quickly is that actors will act accents. They will not act, they will act accents and we were losing everything about these people that we loved. Honestly, I think after maybe one or two auditions we said 'Ok, new rule. We're not doing that anymore'". Mazin also did not cast any American actors, as that could potentially pull the audience out of the story.

On July 26, 2017, it was announced that HBO and Sky had given a series order to Chernobyl. It was HBO's first co-production with Sky UK. The five-episode miniseries was written by Craig Mazin and directed by Johan Renck. Mazin also served as an executive producer alongside Carolyn Strauss and Jane Featherstone, with Chris Fry and Renck acting as co-executive producers. On March 11, 2019, it was announced that the miniseries would premiere on May 6, 2019. On June 4, 2019, Craig Mazin made the original scripts of all episodes available for downloading as PDFs (see External links below).

A companion podcast for the miniseries had new episodes published as each TV episode aired on HBO. The podcast featured conversations between Mazin and host Peter Sagal including discussions of where the show was as true as possible to historical events and where events were consolidated or modified as part of artistic license.

Casting
Simultaneously with the initial series announcement, it was confirmed that Jared Harris would star in the series. On March 19, 2018, it was announced that Stellan Skarsgård and Emily Watson had joined the main cast, marking their second collaboration after Breaking the Waves. In May 2018, it was announced that Paul Ritter, Jessie Buckley, Adrian Rawlins, and Con O'Neill also had joined the cast.

Filming

Principal photography began in April 2018 in Lithuania. Initial filming started on May 13, 2018, in Fabijoniškės, a residential district in Vilnius, Lithuania, which was used to portray the Ukrainian city of Pripyat, since the district maintained an authentic Soviet atmosphere. An area of densely built panel housing apartments served as a location for the evacuation scenes. Director Johan Renck heavily criticised the amount of diverse and eye-catching modern windows in the houses, but was not concerned about removing them in post-production. At the end of March, production moved to Visaginas, Lithuania, to shoot both the exterior and interior of the Ignalina Nuclear Power Plant, a decommissioned nuclear power station that is sometimes referred to as "Chernobyl's sister" due to its visual resemblance and the nuclear reactor design used at both Chernobyl and Ignalina (RBMK nuclear power reactor). In early June 2018, production moved to Ukraine to shoot minor final scenes. The filming of Chernobyl took 16 weeks.

Music

The musical score was composed by Icelandic composer Hildur Guðnadóttir. In August 2018, she began recording the score with Chris Watson at the Ignalina Nuclear Power Plant, where the series being preliminarily shot. She used the recordings from the power plant, deciding not to depend on instruments and pre-recorded material to create the score, as she wanted to experience from a listener's perspective on what it is like to actually be inside of a power plant. The original score album was released by the record labels Deutsche Grammophon and WaterTower Music on May 31, 2019, with a vinyl edition released by Decca on September 6, 2019.

Historical accuracy
The series was exhaustively researched, but some liberties were taken for dramatic purposes, such as Legasov being present at the trial. The first episode depicts Legasov timing his suicide down to the second (1:23:45) to coincide with the second anniversary of the Chernobyl explosion. In reality, Legasov committed suicide a day later. The epilogue acknowledges that the character of Ulana Khomyuk is fictional, a composite of multiple Soviet scientists. Chernobyl expert Adam Higginbotham points out in an interview that there was no need for scientists to "uncover the truth"; that "many nuclear scientists knew all along that there were problems with this reactor—the problems that led ultimately to an explosion and disaster". Artistic license was also used in the depiction of the "Bridge of Death," from which spectators in Pripyat watched the immediate aftermath of the explosion; the miniseries asserts that all of the spectators subsequently died, a claim which is now generally held to be an urban legend.

The series also discusses a potential third steam explosion, due to the risk of corium melting through to the water reservoirs below the reactor building, as being in the range of 2 to 4 megatons. This would have been physically impossible under the circumstances, as the only known means of producing such a powerful explosion is a thermonuclear bomb, a highly contrived mechanism involving far more highly enriched fissile material than the reactor fuel present at Chernobyl. In reality, the potential third explosion would likely have been closer in size to the previous two explosions that had destroyed the core. According to series author Craig Mazin, the claim was based on one made by Belarusian nuclear physicist Vassili Nesterenko about a potential 3–5 Mt third explosion, even though physicists hired for the show were unable to confirm its plausibility. It is not clear where Nesterenko's estimate originated; it may have originally referred not to the energy of the possible third explosion itself, but rather to the resulting radioactive fallout as being comparable to the fallout of a 3–5 Mt hydrogen bomb. This would have been somewhat more plausible under the circumstances, especially in a worst-case scenario involving a major steam explosion ejecting most of reactor 4's remaining fuel into the atmosphere as a fine dust, in addition to destroying reactors 1, 2 and 3. 

The series' production design, such as the choice of sets, props, and costumes, has received high praise for its accuracy. Several sources have commended the attention to even minor setting details, such as the usage of actual Kyiv-region license plate numbers, and a New Yorker review states that "the material culture of the Soviet Union is reproduced with an accuracy that has never before been seen" from either Western or Russian filmmakers. Oleksiy Breus, a Chernobyl engineer, commends the portrayal of the symptoms of radiation poisoning; however, Robert Gale, a doctor who treated Chernobyl victims, states that the miniseries overstated the symptoms by suggesting that the patients were actively radioactive. In a more critical judgment, a review from the Moscow Times highlights some small design errors: for instance, Soviet soldiers are inaccurately shown as holding their weapons in Western style, and Legasov's apartment was too "dingy" for a scientist of his status. During an interview to BBC Russian, the real Lyudmilla Ignatenko described how she suffered harassment and criticism when the series was aired. She claimed reporters hounded her at home in Moscow and even jammed their foot in her door as they tried to interview her, and that she suffered criticism for exposing her unborn daughter to Vasily, despite the fact she hadn't known anything about radiation then, and that risk to a fetus from such an exposure is infinitesimally small. She said she never gave HBO and Sky Atlantic permission to tell her story, saying there had been a single phone call offering money after filming had been completed. She thought the call was a hoax because it came from a Moscow number, and hung up. HBO Sky rejects this, saying they had multiple exchanges with Lyudmilla before, during, and after filming with the opportunity to participate and provide feedback, and at no time did she express a wish for her story to not be included.

The portrayal of Soviet officials, including both plant management and central government figures, received some criticism. Breus, the Chernobyl engineer, argues that the characters of Viktor Bryukhanov, Nikolai Fomin, and Anatoly Dyatlov were "distorted and misrepresented, as if they were villains." Similarly, multiple reviews criticize the series for creating a stark moral dichotomy, in which the scientists are depicted as overly heroic while the government and plant officials are uniformly villainous. The occasional threats of execution from government officials were also seen by some as anachronistic: Masha Gessen of the New Yorker argues that "summary executions, or even delayed executions on orders of a single apparatchik, were not a feature of Soviet life after the nineteen-thirties." Higginbotham takes a more positive view of the portrayal of the authorities, arguing that the unconcerned attitude of the central government was accurately depicted.

Release
The miniseries premiered on May 6, 2019, on HBO. In the United Kingdom and Republic of Ireland, it premiered on May 7, 2019, on Sky Atlantic.

Home media
The miniseries was released on Blu-ray and DVD on October 1, 2019. A 4K Ultra HD Blu-ray was released on December 1, 2020.

Reception

Critical response
Chernobyl received widespread critical acclaim. On review aggregator Rotten Tomatoes, the series has an approval rating of 95% based on 104 reviews, with an average rating of 8.9/10. The website's critics consensus reads: "Chernobyl rivets with a creeping dread that never dissipates, dramatizing a national tragedy with sterling craft and an intelligent dissection of institutional rot." On Metacritic, it has a weighted average score of 82 out of 100, based on 27 critics, indicating "universal acclaim".

Reviewers from The Atlantic, The Washington Post, and BBC observed parallels to contemporary society by focusing on the power of information and how dishonest leaders can make mistakes beyond their comprehension. Sophie Gilbert of The Atlantic hailed the series as a "grim disquisition on the toll of devaluing the truth"; Hank Stuever of The Washington Post praised it for showcasing "what happens when lying is standard and authority is abused". Meera Syal praised Chernobyl as a "fiercely intelligent exposition of the human cost of state censorship. Would love to see similar exposé of the Bhopal disaster". David Morrison was "struck by the attention to accuracy" and says the "series does an outstanding job of presenting the technical and human issues of the accident."

Jennifer K. Crosby, writing for The Objective Standard, says that the miniseries "explores the reasons for this monumental catastrophe and illustrates how it was magnified by the evasion and denial of those in charge," adding that "although the true toll of the disaster on millions of lives will never be known, Chernobyl goes a long way toward helping us understand [its] real causes and effects." Aaron Giovannone writes critically of the series in the socialist publication Jacobin, stating that "even as we worry about the ongoing ecological crisis caused by capitalism, Chernobyl revels in the failure of the historical alternative to capitalism," which reinforces the status quo, offering us "no way out" of the crisis.

Russian, Belarusian and Ukrainian response
The miniseries was well-received by some critics and audiences in Russia. Vladimir Medinsky, Russian culture minister, whose father was one of the Chernobyl liquidators, called the series "masterfully made" and "filmed with great respect for ordinary people". It was reported that Russian state-run NTV television channel has been producing its own "patriotic" version of the Chernobyl story in which the CIA plays a key role in the disaster. The Russians then claimed that the series in question had been in production since before HBO's miniseries and was not created in response to it. An apparent trailer for the series was uploaded to YouTube but was later deleted following negative reaction from the Russian viewers.

The Communists of Russia party called for a libel lawsuit against Chernobyls writer, director and producers, describing the show as "disgusting". In a statement, party member Sergey Malinkovich spoke of the party's intentions to lobby TV regulator Roskomnadzor to request that it block local access to the series.  Marianna Prysiazhniuk of Vice Media notes that multiple Russian media outlets describe the miniseries as one-sided, incomplete, or anti-Russian propaganda. Argumenty i Fakty dismissed the show as "a caricature and not the truth" and "The only things missing are the bears and accordions!" said Stanislav Natanzon, lead anchor of Russia-24, one of the country's main state-run news channels.

In Ukraine, Anna Korolevska, deputy director at the Ukrainian National Chernobyl Museum in Kyiv, said "Today young people coming to power in Ukraine know nothing about that disaster in 1986. It was a necessary film to make and HBO have obviously tried their best; as for us, we are going to create a special tour about Chernobyl's historic truth, inspired by the HBO series." Bermet Talant, a Ukrainian journalist, noted that "In Russia, a state that still takes pride in the Soviet legacy, the series has faced criticism from the official media. Meanwhile, many in Ukraine appreciated the series for humanizing a tragic chapter in the country's history. […] Ukrainian viewers also appreciated HBO's Chernobyl for praising the heroism and self-sacrifice of ordinary people."

Belarusian Nobel laureate Svetlana Alexievich, whose book inspired the series, said "We are now witnessing a new phenomenon that Belarusians, who suffered greatly and thought they knew a lot about the tragedy, have completely changed their perception about Chernobyl and are interpreting this tragedy in a whole new way. The authors accomplished this, even though they are from a completely different world – not from Belarus, not from our region." She also noted its popularity with young Belarusians.

Reception in China 
At the onset of the COVID-19 pandemic in China, Chinese netizens drew parallels between the Soviet response to the Chernobyl disaster and the initial handling of the coronavirus outbreak by the Chinese government. As a response, the page for Chernobyl on Douban, which by that point had amassed more than 200,000 ratings with an average of 9.6 out of 10, was taken down.

US ratings

Awards and nominations

See also
 List of Chernobyl-related articles
 Nuclear and radiation accidents and incidents
 Radiation protection
 Signs and symptoms of radiation poisoning

Notes

References

External links

  – official site (HBO)
  – official site (Sky)
 
 Chernobyl episode scripts
 The Chernobyl Podcast – official miniseries podcast

2010s American drama television miniseries
2010s British television miniseries
2019 American television series debuts
2019 American television series endings
2019 British television series debuts
2019 British television series endings
American biographical series
American television docudramas
Best Miniseries or Television Movie Golden Globe winners
British television docudramas
Chernobyl disaster in fiction
Cultural depictions of Mikhail Gorbachev
Disaster television series
English-language television shows
HBO original programming
Peabody Award-winning television programs
Primetime Emmy Award for Outstanding Miniseries winners
Primetime Emmy Award-winning television series
Sky Atlantic original programming
Soviet Union in fiction
Television controversies in Russia
Television series based on actual events
Television series by Home Box Office
Television series set in 1986
Television series set in the 1980s
Television shows directed by Johan Renck
Television shows filmed in Lithuania
Television shows filmed in Ukraine
Television shows set in Belarus
Television shows set in Moscow
Television shows set in Russia
Television shows set in Ukraine
Works about the Chernobyl disaster